Mystic Aquarium is a marine aquarium in Mystic, Connecticut. It is one of only two U.S. facilities holding Steller sea lions, and it has the only beluga whales in New England. Special exhibits include a ray and shark touch pool, an African penguin exhibit, a jelly gallery, and the "Jurassic Giants" dinosaur exhibit (closed in 2022 for renovations). The aquarium is a member of the Alliance of Marine Mammal Parks and Aquariums (AMMPA) and is an accredited member of the Association of Zoos and Aquariums (AZA). It is a subsidiary of the Sea Research Foundation, Inc.

History 

Mystic Aquarium was first opened in 1973 as a privately owned corporation. Industrialist and philanthropist Kelvin Smith was the primary shareholder; he chose Mystic, Connecticut as the site because of the area's scenic shoreline and rich maritime history. In 1999, the aquarium and Ballard's Institute for Exploration combined to form a $52 million expansion. The expansion features the Arctic Coast, a  outdoor beluga whale display containing  of water.

The aquarium hosted several marine mammals from the Shedd Aquarium while it was undergoing renovation to its marine mammal habitat between September 2008 and May 2009. The National Geographic Society's Crittercam exhibit was set up at the aquarium in February 2011 but has since been removed.

In 2012, Mystic Aquarium opened the Ocean Exploration Center featuring maps, diagrams, and models from Dr. Robert Ballard's explorations of the Black Sea and of the wreck of the RMS Titanic. Presentations in the Nautilus Live Theater told more of Ballard's recent explorations and the ship E/V Nautilus. Audience members had a live link to crew members on the ship at sea and could ask them questions directly. The aquarium opened Titanic – 12,450 Feet Below on April 12, 2012 to commemorate the 100th anniversary of the sinking of the RMS Titanic. The exhibit was created by Ballard, who found the Titanic in 1985, and Tim Delaney, a former Walt Disney Imagineer. It was funded by a $1 million donation from United Technologies Corporation.  After being open to the public for over three and a half years the exhibit came to a close in January of 2015. 

The aquarium was presented with the National Medal for Museum and Library Service in 2014. The award was accepted by Sea Research Foundation's president Stephen M. Coan. The Titanic exhibit was also remodeled into a new  exhibit named Exploration: Wild in 2015, after Ballard ended his association with the aquarium. The new exhibit was designed entirely by aquarium staff and cost $500,000; it focuses on conservation and consists of interactive environments highlighting desert, rainforest, the Arctic, wetlands, and the open ocean.

Animals

Mystic Aquarium holds six beluga whales (Juno, Natasha, Kela & 3 more), four Steller sea lions, six northern fur seals (two adult and four pups), six California sea lions, one Pacific and seven Atlantic harbor seals, two Arctic spotted seals, a large colony of 31 African penguins, unicorn fish, blue tang, octopus, Japanese spider crabs, sand tiger sharks, bamboo sharks, sea turtle, clownfish, an extensive sea jelly exhibit, seasonal birds, and other oceanic creatures. It is among the first aquariums to attempt artificial insemination of a beluga whale as part of its conservation work, in order to increase breeding in human care.

Within the aquarium, encounter programs are offered to visitors for an additional fee, who can get close to the African penguins, touch and stand in the water with beluga whales, touch bamboo sharks, and feed and touch sting rays in a special pool.

Other Experiences 
Aside from the exhibits included with the price of admission there are other experiences people may enjoy for an additional cost. One of these add on experiences is Jurassic Giants. Jurassic Giants includes two 4D experiences, a walk through with animatronic dinosaurs, as well as frogs and other reptiles. There is another experience called the Undersea Explorer Virtual Reality where participants lay in a pod and experience a virtual reality world. After putting on a virtual reality headset the participant can pick from a variety of themed worlds to explore.

People can also have private events at the aquarium. A list of some of these events include weddings, corporate, proms, holiday, social, convention, and non-profit events.

Beluga Whale deaths controversy

Two beluga whales died in the aquarium within a year. The aquarium imported five individuals of the species from a facility in Canada in May 2021 despite outcries from animal rights groups and a lawsuit. A few months later, in August 2021, 5-year-old Havok died while being treated for gastrointestinal issues. After Havok’s death, the US Department of Agriculture conducted a focused inspection of the aquarium and found three critical violations involving Havok’s veterinary care, his handling, and the facilities. The report found that the aquarium failed to provide adequate veterinary care in the last eight hours of Havok’s life.

Six year old Havana died in February 2022. An examination later showed numerous significant lesions indicating storage disease in the whale’s brain and spinal cord and acute cardiac failure. 

Because a common link between the whale deaths is where the whales came from, Mystic Aquarium said that they have a research team in Canada working with a veterinarian who they contracted to help Marineland, the original facility, and look closely at the population of beluga whales there.

References

External links

Aquaria in Connecticut
Mystic, Connecticut
Tourist attractions in New London County, Connecticut
Buildings and structures in New London County, Connecticut